Ahmed Faheem (born 4 December 1994) is Pakistani footballer who plays for WAPDA as a winger. Faheem made his club debut in 2014 for Sui Northern Gas. He made his international debut in 2018 in 2018 SAFF Championship against Bangladesh.

Club career

Sui Northern Gas
Faheem started his career with Lahore based Sui Northern Gas, making his debut for the club on 26 November 2014 against Hazara Coal Company in 2014–15 Pakistan Football Federation League. Faheem scored a brace in his debut, scoring the opening goal of the match in 28th minute and his second in 86th minute as Sui Northern Gas won the match 3–1. His second match was a 1–0 defeat to Higher Education Commission. On 15 April 2015, Faheem scored on his National Football Challenge Cup debut against K-Electric in a 3–1 loss in the 86th minute during the group stage match in 2015 NBP National Challenge Cup. Faheem also scored a penalty in 88th minute against rivals Sui Southern Gas in 6–2 defeat in the last match of the National Challenge Cup.

WAPDA
Faheem joined WAPDA in 2018, as there was no football league held since 2015. He scored on his debut for WAPDA in the opening match for 2018–19 Pakistan Premier League against Pakistan Army in a 1–1 draw. Faheem scored his first career hat-trick against Pakistan Navy in a 4–2 victory, scoring his first and third on penalties in 15th and 80th minute and second in 57th minute. On 8 November 2018, he scored the lone goal against Muslim in a 1–0 victory. Faheem ended his season with 11 goals in 20 appearances. Faheem scored in the semi-finals of 2018 National Challenge Cup against Pakistan Petroleum in a 2–0 victory. Faheem scored the opening goal in the finals against Pakistan Airforce in the 11th minute. WAPDA lost the match 2–1.

International career
Faheem made his debut for Pakistan against Bangladesh in 2018 SAFF Championship, coming on as a substitute for Muhammad Adil at the 79th minute. His second international appearances was against Bhutan, coming on as an 88th-minute substitute captain Hassan Bashir. Faheem scored his first international goal in the same match in the 90+1 minute as Pakistan won the match 3–0.

Career statistics

Club

International

International goals
 (Pakistan score listed first, score column indicates score after each Ahmed Faheem goal)

References

External links
Ahmed Faheem Soccerway
Ahmed Faheem Global Sports Archive

1994 births
Living people
Pakistan international footballers
Footballers from Punjab, Pakistan
Association football midfielders
WAPDA F.C. players
Pakistani footballers